Alisha Tatham (born October 14, 1986 in East York) is a Canadian professional basketball player. She plays for Canada women's national basketball team. She has competed in the 2012 Summer Olympics. Her sister Tamara also competed for Canada at the Games.

She also competed for Canada at the 2011 Pan American Games.

Massachusetts statistics 

Source

References

Canadian expatriate basketball people in the United States
Canadian women's basketball players
1986 births
Living people
UMass Minutewomen basketball players
Olympic basketball players of Canada
Basketball players at the 2012 Summer Olympics
Basketball players at the 2011 Pan American Games
Black Canadian basketball players
Pan American Games competitors for Canada
Sportspeople from Brampton